The Ministry of Economic Development, Job Creation and Trade (formally known as Ministry of Economic Development and Growth) in the Canadian province of Ontario is responsible for programs to attract and retain business and economic development in the province. This is pursued through research and development funding, business advisory services, career exploration opportunities and business startup programs for youth, skills development and marketing Ontario to potential international business investors.

It was previously responsible for the Liquor Control Board of Ontario and the Ontario Lottery and Gaming Corporation, though this responsibility has been shifted to the Ministry of Government Services.

Ministry Agencies 

 Agent-General 
 Expert Review Panel for the Ontario Research Fund Review 
 Ontario Capital Growth Corporation
 Ontario Immigrant Investor Corporation
 Ontario's Representative in Washington D. C.

History
Responsibilities for economic development in the Ontario government shifted over time as the province's economy evolved.

Prior to confederation, the Bureau of Agriculture of the Province of Canada was responsible for collecting facts and statistics relating to the agricultural, mechanical and manufacturing interests. 

On March 4, 1868, the Act for the Encouragement of Agriculture, Horticulture, Arts, and Manufactures received royal assent, establishing the Department of the Commissioner of Agriculture and Public Works. "Arts", at the time, referred to the practical application of an industrial, manufacturing, or scientific pursuit, rather than to its current meaning. In 1877, the department was renamed the Department of the Commissioner of Agriculture and Arts. The industrial, or "arts", functions of the department were carried out through the Bureau of Agriculture and Arts from 1877 until 1882, and  the Bureau of Industries from 1882. Although the Bureau was under the general direction of the Commissioner of Agriculture (or the Minister of Agriculture after 1888), the day to day operations were carried out by a small staff under the direction of the Secretary of the Bureau of Industries. From 1880 on however, the focus of that bureau  was agricultural in nature. In the late 1800s and early 1900s, the responsibilities for various manufacturing industrial matters were carried out at various times by the Department of the Provincial Secretary, Department of Education, and the Bureau of Labour among others.

The Department of Planning and Development was established in 1944. Initially, its mandate was focused in postwar rehabilitation efforts. Over time, the department was mandated to work with agricultural, industrial, labour, mining, trade and other associations and organisations and with public and private sector enterprises in order to create and maintain productive employment and to develop the human and material resources of the province. In addition to trade and industry, the department at various times also had responsibilities over immigration, community planning, conservation, civil defence/emergency management. 

For most of 1961, the department was briefly renamed the Department of Commerce and Development. In December 1961, the department took over certain functions of the Department of Economics and Federal and Provincial Relations (predecessor of the Ministry of Finance) and was renamed the Department of Economics and Development.

In 1968, the department was renamed the Department of Trade and Development. In April 1972, the department merged with the Department of Tourism and Information to form the Ministry of Industry and Tourism. 

A standalone economic portfolio was recreated in 1982, named Ministry of Industry and Trade. The ministry subsequently went through frequent name changes in the following decades, reflecting shifting economic and political priorities of the governments of the day. For example in 1985, it was renamed Ministry of Industry, Trade and Technology to reflect the growing importance of technology in Ontario's economy. 

Since 1993, the department was mostly named the Ministry of Economic Development and Trade or some similar variations, except between 2002 and 2003 when it was briefly named Ministry of Enterprise, Opportunity and Innovation. 

A related Ministry of Research and Innovation, and later Ministry of Research, Innovation and Science, existed between 2005 and 2018. While politically a standalone ministry, it shared a deputy minister (civil service head) with the main economic development ministry, and was supported by civil servants of the economic development ministry.  

A related Ministry of International Trade existed between 2008 and 2009, and again from 2016 and 2018.

List of ministers

See also
 Ministry of Infrastructure (Ontario)

References

External links
 Official Site
 InvestInOntario Site

Economic Development, Job Creation and Trade
Public works ministries
Subnational economy ministries